Yelovka is a rural locality (a selo) in Tunkinsky District, Republic of Buryatia, Russia. The population was 260 as of 2010. There are 6 streets.

Geography 
Yelovka is located 55 km east of Kyren (the district's administrative centre) by road. Akhalik is the nearest rural locality.

References 

Rural localities in Tunkinsky District